Eudonia pygmina is a moth in the family Crambidae. It was described by Patrice J.A. Leraut in 1988. It is found in French Guiana.

References

Moths described in 1988
Eudonia